J. Uduch Sengebau Senior (born 1965, Ngerbeched, Koror, Palau) is a Palauan lawyer, judge, and politician who has served as the Vice President of Palau since 2021. She was previously a member of the Senate of Palau from 2013 until she took office as Vice President. 

Senior attended Catholic primary school in Palau before receiving her high school education in Waiakea High School, Hawaii, from where she graduated in 1983. She subsequently studied at the University of Hawaii, receiving a Bachelor of Arts and then graduating with a Juris Doctor degree in 1993. She returned to work in Palau as a staff attorney of the Micronesian Legal Services Corporation, and also worked as an assistant attorney general, an associate judge of the Land Court and an associate justice pro tem of the appellate division of the Supreme Court of Palau. She was senior judge of the Land Court from 2003 until her resignation in 2007. Senior then worked as a lawyer in private practice until her election to parliament.

She was first elected to the Senate at the 2012 election. In her first term, she introduced a bill mandating maternity leave and banning discrimination against pregnant women, and advocated for gender equality in public office. She also established a non-government organisation, Centre for Women’s Empowerment Palau, to support women in leadership positions. She was re-elected at the 2016 election. She was formerly the Chairperson of the Senate Judiciary & Governmental Affairs Committee, but resigned in July 2017.

References

1965 births
Living people
21st-century Palauan politicians
21st-century Palauan women politicians
Female foreign ministers
Members of the Senate of Palau
Palauan lawyers
People from Koror
University of Hawaiʻi alumni
Vice presidents of Palau
Women judges
Women vice presidents